Naglaa Fathi aka Nagla' Fathi , whose birth name is  Fatmah Elzahra' Hesin Fathi (born 21 December 1951),.  Nagla' Fathi, is an Egyptian actress. She started her acting career in 1967 and has played a role in over 80 films. She established a production company and produced films, including film : Supermarket (1990)  in which she was actress also. The award-winning actress also wrote the screenplay for Tomorrow I Will Take Revenge, (1980).

Career
Naglaa Fathi started her acting career in Egyptian cinema at age 15 when she was approached by the Egyptian film-producer Adli Elmowalled, while she was at the beach in Alexandria with her friends. When she was 15 years old she became an actress in the movie The Three Friends. She dropped out of school in 1967 to get involved in acting. Her career began in earnest and she starred in the 1968 Egyptian film Afrah (meaning "Joys"), produced in Beirut, Lebanon. The director of the film, Ali Badrakhan had reservations about Naglaa, but fellow producer Ramses Naguib saw her as potential romance icon. Throughout the 1970s, she acted in roughly 15 films a year, predominantly romantic dramas, including her 1970 film Imra'at Zawgy (Arabic: إمرأة زوجي, meaning My Husband's Wife) opposite Salah Zulfikar. In the Egyptian film industry, she was only second to actress Faten Hamama in the number of romance films acted in, though not as popular since she was mostly given secondary roles to male characters. During the 1980s, Fathi largely departed from this role and began acting more complicated roles in movies dealing with a social and political dimension.
She received an award for best actress for her starring role in El Garage (1995), where she played a deserted and impoverished single mother who lives inside a garage with her five children, all of whom she gradually gives up to other families as her health deteriorates. The film was based on a true story and Fathi described it as the "most difficult and painful" role she has had to play. According to writer Nagla El-Baz, the movie was a success in raising awareness about the issue of overpopulation.

Personal life
Fathi was born in Heliopolis, Cairo, Egypt to an Egyptian family consisting of a father from Fayyum and a mother from Heliopolis, Cairo. Her first marriage was a secret marriage as a teenage, for a short period. Her family did not know about this secret marriage. She had no children from this secret marriage, which ended in divorce. She married again. She had her only child, a daughter named Yasmin, with her second husband. This marriage ended in divorce in 1977. In 1992 she married well-known Egyptian journalist and television presenter Hamdi Qandil. While she stated that her first marriage, in 1969, was a secret kept from her family, she described her second marriage in 1971 as a balancing act for her life amid her new fame and fortune and an attempt to raise a large family. She said in a 2000 interview that Qandil, her current husband, "is the first man who has fascinated me. It is not easy to bewitch me, but he did. I feel like a student when I'm with him: I discover new qualities in him every day."

Fathi is a Nasserist and Arab nationalist; she supports the Palestinian cause and all pan-Arabism causes. When the late Egyptian president Gamal Abdel Nasser declared his resignation after the Egyptian defeat in the 1967 War, she joined demonstrations protesting his departure, which he retracted days later. She has worn the traditional Palestinian rural dress during some interviews and public events as an expression of solidarity and said she was deeply distraught by the events in the Palestinian Territories, particularly stating, "My happiness has been shattered by the events. I don't know how to be happy, really. Something inside me has grown dark."

Selected filmography

Film

Television

References

External links

1951 births
Actresses from Cairo
Egyptian film actresses
Nasserists
Arabists
Egyptian Arab nationalists
Living people
Egyptian twins